Stacy Warner is a fictional recurring character portrayed by Sela Ward on the Fox Broadcasting Company's medical drama House. She was in a relationship with Dr. Gregory House (Hugh Laurie), when a clotted aneurysm in his right thigh led to an infarction during a game of golf, causing his quadriceps muscle to become necrotic. Regarding House's treatment, Stacy acted against House's wishes when he was put into a chemically induced coma. She authorized a safer surgical middle-ground procedure by removing just the dead muscle, leaving House with a lesser, but serious, level of pain for the rest of his life. House could not forgive her and they broke up. The two meet again, five years later, at the end of season one; Stacy wants House to treat her husband, Mark (Currie Graham). House correctly diagnoses Mark with acute intermittent porphyria, and so he has to remain at the hospital for close monitoring. Stacy becomes the hospital's lawyer, and she and House grow closer together. When she is ultimately willing to leave Mark for him, House tells her to go back to Mark, which devastates her and causes her and Mark to leave the city.

When the writers of the show wrote "Three Stories", the first episode in which Stacy appeared, the first name they came up with to play the character was Sela Ward. Although Ward was not initially interested in portraying Stacy, she changed her mind after watching tapes of the show. While she was originally hired to appear in only two episodes of the first season, the chemistry between Ward and Laurie was strong enough to have her appear in seven more second season episodes. She also appeared in the House finale "Everybody Dies". Stacy was received mostly positively by critics who considered her arc a "juicy subplot".

Arc
Although not much is revealed about Stacy's early life, it is said in "Acceptance" that she is a Duke University graduate. Presumably ten years before the events of House, at a "Doctors vs. Lawyers" paintball game, she met Dr. Gregory House (Hugh Laurie) with whom she started a romantic relationship. Five years later, during a game of golf, House suffered an infarction in his right leg. He was admitted at the Princeton-Plainsboro Teaching Hospital, but went misdiagnosed for three days due to doctors' concerns that he was exhibiting drug-seeking behavior (House eventually diagnosed the infarction himself). An aneurysm in his thigh had clotted, leading to an infarction and causing his quadriceps muscle to become necrotic. House had the dead muscle bypassed in order to restore circulation to the remainder of his leg, risking organ failure and cardiac arrest. He was willing to endure excruciating post-operative pain to retain the use of his leg. After he was put into a chemically induced coma to sleep through the worst of the pain, Stacy, his medical proxy at the time, acted against his wishes and authorized a safer surgical middle-ground procedure between amputation and a bypass by removing just the dead muscle. This resulted in the partial loss of use in his leg, and left House with a lesser, but still serious, level of pain for the rest of his life. House could not forgive Stacy for making the decision, which caused their relationship to end.

Stacy goes to visit House again in "Three Stories", five years after their break up. She has married Mark Warner (Currie Graham), a high school guidance counselor. Stacy believes Mark is ill, and wants House to treat him. However, Mark does not believe anything is wrong with him. Similarly, the members of House's diagnostic team are not able to find any medical problems. After various failed attempts to diagnose Mark, House tests Mark’s urine for porphobilinogen. The test is positive, and Mark is diagnosed with acute intermittent porphyria (AIP). He is therefore required to undergo "close monitoring" at the hospital for a while. Stacy makes a deal with Lisa Cuddy (Lisa Edelstein) to become the hospital's lawyer during Mark's stay. While there, she and House grow closer. In "Need to Know", they end up spending the night together. However, when Stacy admits that she is willing to leave Mark for House, House rejects her, stating that he cannot make her happy, because he cannot change. Stacy quits her job and returns to Short Hills, New Jersey, with Mark. She later appears in the series finale, "Everybody Dies", first as one of House's hallucinations and then again at House's funeral.

Personality
House creator David Shore says that Stacy is the "true love that got away.” She is "quick" and "witty", “the one character who is able to spar with House on a level playing field." Actress Sela Ward has described her character as a window into both House's vulnerability and his heart. House himself describes Stacy as "very convincing.” He is willing to believe Stacy’s word that Mark is ill despite Mark’s own denial. Many critics noted that Stacy's presence affected House's behavior. Diane Kristine of Blog Critics stated that, with Stacy, House was "almost nice.” Although Stacy tells House on several occasions that she loves Mark, she is still in love with House and was willing to have an affair with him. However, she admits that she finds House selfish whereas Mark leaves “room for [her]".

Development

According to the producers of House, Stacy was brought into the show to give viewers some insight into House’s character. The writers chose to start off Stacy's story arc "very subtly,” but to end it with a "big blowout.” Shore explained that he wanted Ward for the part because she was the first person the writing staff suggested, adding that she acts in a "simple" and "convincing way.“ Initially, Ward was not interested in taking the role because, after the cancellation of Once and Again, she wanted to spend more time with her kids, which is why she had also turned down earlier roles on CSI: Miami and Desperate Housewives. However, she changed her mind after watching tapes of the show, because she realized that House "would be fun to be a part of".

In a 2005 Entertainment Weekly interview, Ward, who had never appeared in a medical show before, stated that when she was young, her mother was sick for over nine years and she spent a lot of time in hospitals. Because of this, she felt “at home” on the set of House. Although Ward was initially only hired to appear in "Three Stories" and "Honeymoon,” the chemistry between Ward and House lead actor Hugh Laurie was strong enough for her to return for a multiple-episode arc in the second season. On working with Ward, Laurie commented: "we’re professionals who were lucky enough to be extremely well-equipped with a very sound, true script, the fact that Sela is immensely attractive and we got on well certainly is not an impediment." Though Ward expressed interest in returning to the show, Shore told USA Today in 2006 that, although he was eager to write her back in, there were "no specific plans" to bring Stacy back.

Reception
Initial responses to Stacy were mostly positive. TV Guides Matt Roush stated that he was pleased with the character showing of House's soft side, calling the character's story arc a "juicy subplot". David Bianculli of The New York Daily News stated that with the addition of Stacy, House shifted "to the top echelon of today's TV dramas". Critics from USA Today stated Ward "brought a sense of joy, if fleeting, to the show". In an article about who annoyed House the most, Entertainment Weeklys Alynda Wheat stated that Stacy annoyed House third most, ranking behind Amber Volakis (Anne Dudek) and Michael Tritter (David Morse). However, Alan Sepinwall, of the Star-Ledger, commented that although he finds Ward a "talented" actress, her character, along with prior, and later, recurring characters, was "humorless" and "determined to ruin the audience's fun right along with House's".

References

External links

House (TV series) characters
Fictional lawyers
Fictional characters from New Jersey
Television characters introduced in 2005